Siena College Research Institute (SCRI) is an affiliate of Siena College, located originally in Friars Hall and now in Hines Hall on the college's campus, in Loudonville, New York, in suburban Albany.  It was founded in 1980.

It conducts both expert and public opinion polls, focusing on New York State and the United States, on issues of public policy interest.  They include education, health care, and consumer confidence, and explores business, economic, political, voter, social, educational, and historical issues. Most recently, SCRI conducted surveys on New Yorkers' sentiments towards the creation of the Cordoba House Mosque near the World Trade Center site in lower Manhattan, and the Arizona Immigration Law.

In 2018, SCRI and The New York Times partnered to deliver the first real time Midterm Election polls. It currently holds an 'A' rating from FiveThirtyEight.

Among other things, starting in 1982 SCRI has polled presidential scholars in an effort to rate both the United States presidents and U.S. First Ladies.  It has also conducted polls as to America's most notable women, television's most memorable moment, and consumer confidence.

Statistics and finance professor Doug Lonnstrom was its founding Director.  Dr. Donald Levy is its current Director.

See also 

 Quinnipiac University Polling Institute
 Emerson College Polling
 Franklin & Marshall College Poll
 Suffolk University Political Research Center
 Monmouth University Polling Institute
 Marist Institute for Public Opinion

References

External links
Siena College Research Institute

Colonie, New York
Siena College
Public opinion research companies in the United States
Companies based in New York (state)
Companies established in 1980